Du Preez Grobler (born 8 June 1977 in Keetmanshoop, ǁKaras Region) is a Namibian rugby union centre. He played with the Namibia national rugby union team at the 2003 Rugby World Cup and 2007 Rugby World Cup.

References

1977 births
Living people
People from Keetmanshoop
Namibian rugby union players
Rugby union centres
Namibia international rugby union players